Ivor McMahon (1924–1972) was an English violinist. He played with notable orchestras including the Philharmonia Orchestra and the English Chamber Orchestra and is best known for playing second violin in the Melos Ensemble.

Career 

In 1947 McMahon was the first recipient of the Eda Kersey Memorial Exhibition, established after the death of Eda Kersey to assist a gifted young violinist each year. He played with the Philharmonia Orchestra from 1952, conducted by Arturo Toscanini. In 1955 he took part in the orchestra's tour of the United States, conducted by Herbert von Karajan. Ivor McMahon played second violin in the Melos Ensemble and participated with the group in the premiere of the War Requiem by Benjamin Britten, conducted by the composer. As a member of the English Chamber Orchestra he took part in Britten's chamber operas Albert Herring and Noye's Fludde. With violinist Emanuel Hurwitz and harpsichordist Charles Spinks he recorded concertos of Charles Avison. From 1950 until his death he was married to British violinist Nona Liddell, former leader of the London Sinfonietta; they had a daughter.

Recordings with the Melos Ensemble 

McMahon recorded chamber music with the Melos Ensemble, its principal players Richard Adeney and William Bennett (flute), Gervase de Peyer (clarinet), Peter Graeme (oboe), Neill Sanders and James Buck (horn), William Waterhouse (bassoon), Emanuel Hurwitz, Kenneth Sillito and Iona Brown (violin), Cecil Aronowitz  and Kenneth Essex (viola), Terence Weil and Keith Harvey (cello), Adrian Beers (double bass), Osian Ellis and Hilary Wilson (harp) and Lamar Crowson (piano).

This included works for a large ensemble of both woodwinds and strings, for which the Melos Ensemble was founded.
 Beethoven: Sextet for two horns and string quartet, Op. 81b
 Mendelssohn: Octet
 Schubert: Octet
 Louis Spohr: Double Quartet No. 1 in D minor, Op. 65
 Janáček: Concertino
 Ravel: Introduction and Allegro
 Jean Françaix: Divertissement
 Nikos Skalkottas: Octet
 Sergei Prokofiev: Overture on Hebrew Themes
 Harrison Birtwistle: Tragoedia
In Françaix's Divertissement for bassoon and string quintet (1942),  played with bassoonist William Waterhouse, to whom the piece is dedicated. McMahon also recorded chamber music for smaller formations, such as the clarinet quintets of Mozart, Brahms, Weber, Reger and Bliss, with clarinettist Gervase de Peyer.
 Mozart: Clarinet Quintet
 Brahms: Clarinet Quintet
 Carl Maria von Weber: Clarinet Quintet
 Max Reger: Clarinet Quintet
 Arthur Bliss: Quintet for Oboe and Strings, Quintet for Clarinet and Strings

References

External links 

 [ Entry for Ivor McMahon] in Allmusic

1924 births
1972 deaths
British classical violinists
British male violinists
20th-century classical violinists
20th-century British musicians
20th-century British male musicians
Male classical violinists